Survivor's Law II (Traditional Chinese: 律政新人王II) is a 20-episode TVB drama broadcast between December 2007 and January and January 2008. It is the direct sequel to 2003's Survivor's Law (律政新人王). The main cast features Sammul Chan from the original series with the new addition of Kenneth Ma and Ella Koon.

Synopsis
"Equal Just Under Law"
It isn't slanted by prejudice or bias of any kind

MK Sun Man-Kwan (Kenneth Ma) was once stopping a drug smuggler, but because of that, he was wrongly accused of taking drugs. Despite his background, he hired a famous lawyer to help him, and not surprisingly, he won. The lawyer, Brandon (Waise Lee), became his idol, and MK Sun grew up to be a lawyer.

Years later, MK was trying to get a job in his idols company, TB&B. He beats Brandon's wife, Brenda (Rebecca Chan), in a case, and started working there. There he meets a stubborn, rich, and spoiled girl named Lily, (Ella Koon) only caring about her looks and herself. They became enemies because of each other's backgrounds and attitudes.

MK Sun then meets Vincent (Sammul Chan). Vincent thought of MK Sun as ghetto, but soon realizes he was wrong. After having a fight with him in soccer, and Vincent punched the umpire, MK Sun took the blame. Soon, they became best friends.

After splitting with his former girlfriend, Jessica (Bernice Liu), Vincent falls in love with a coffee shop girl called Cheng Choi-Yuk (Selena Li). Vincent had his license for being a lawyer taken away for three years and couldn't get his license back yet. After getting a chance to work again and start a new refreshing career, he started only caring for himself. He was so determined that he went against Choi-Yuk and her family, even his best friend, MK Sun. Choi-Yuk thought he betrayed them and only cared about himself so she ended the relationship.

In a court case, MK finally confesses of his love to Lily, but she didn't like him back because of his background. But after MK jumped into the sea (to swim back to get to a court case) and ended up in the hospital, she started to like him. During the court case over Bo-Bo's custody she proposed to him and asked for custody, which they got, and they eventually got married in court.

Soon, Choi-Yuk gets into hospital after taking a beating in the head, falls into a coma, and gives birth to a baby boy named Jophy. Vincent, while trying to uncover Noel and her previous crimes, smashes his head to a drawer while avoiding a knife. While Choi-Yuk just woke back up and waiting for Vincent to return, she sees Vincent in a stretcher. She hurried there with Jophy and thought they could finally be a happy family, but Vincent does not recognize her, having received a big blow to the head and is suffering amnesia.

However, to prevent Choi-Yuk from despairing too much from not remembering her and Jophy, he promises that some day he will propose to her and they will get married. He never regains his memory and ends up working at the cake shop with Choi-Yuk. MK and Lily share a sweet and happy relationship.

Cast

Law firm

Sun family

Suen family

Cheng family

Miscellaneous

Viewership ratings

Awards and nominations
41st TVB Anniversary Awards (2008)
 "Best Drama"
 "Best Actor in a Leading Role" (Kenneth Ma - MK Sun Man-Kwan)
 "My Favourite Male Character" (Kenneth Ma - MK Sun Man-Kwan)

References

External links
TVB.com Survivor's Law II - Official Website 
K for TVB.net Survivor's Law II - Episodic Synopsis and Screen Captures 

TVB dramas
Hong Kong legal television series
2007 Hong Kong television series debuts
2008 Hong Kong television series endings